Muharrem Blakçori (1894–1968) was an Albanian author and activist known for having translated the first Albanian language version of the Quran.

References

Translators of the Quran into Albanian
1894 births
1968 deaths
20th-century translators